Syria first competed at the Asian Games in 1978 and is also a member of the West Asian Zone of the Olympic Council of Asia (OCA). The National Olympic Committee for Syria is the Syrian Olympic Committee, and was founded in 1948. Syria got its first gold medal in 1978 Asian Games, when Talal Najjar won the weightlifting 110 kg event.

Medal tables

Medals by Asian Games

Medals by West Asian Games

Medals by Asian Indoor and Martial Arts Games

Medals by Asian Beach Games

Medals by Asian Youth Games

Medals by sport

Asian Games

List of flag bearers

Since the 2006 Asian Games only

See also
Syria at the Olympics
Syria at the Mediterranean Games

References